"Comin' Home" is a song written by Geoff Turner and recorded by Australian band The Radiators. The song was released in September 1979 as the band's debut single, which peaked at number 33 on the Australian Kent Music Report.

Track listing
Side A: "Comin' Home"
Side B: "Numbers"

Charts

Release history

References

1979 songs
1979 debut singles